Diário de Notícias, locally known as Diário de Notícias da Madeira, is a centenary Madeiran newspaper headquartered in Funchal. In January 2020 its daily circulation was on average 9023, making it the biggest Portuguese regional newspaper in circulation. In 2016 it counted 5600 subscribers and its Sunday magazine is D7.

History 
It was founded on October 12, 1876 by Canon Alfredo César de Oliveira, a man of remarkable culture, energetic parliamentary, and ardent polemicist. Considering his intellectual training as a combat journalist, the canon gave a predominantly news feature from the first hour, covering the largest number of regional facts, in order to captivate and interest all social strata, while still agitating and defending real Madeiran problems. 

Also, during the 1876 five newspapers were published periodically: A Verdade, A Aurora Liberal, A Aurora Literária, Estrela Académica and Liberal. The difference between Diário de Notícias and its competitors laid on the fact that the first  presented itself as a daily publication, which at the time many though unimaginable given the population of readers on the island. In its first issue, a sentence stands out in the editorial that reflects the character and objectives of the journal:«... we strive, as much as it fits in the interests of the population.»Tristão Vaz Teixeira de Bettencourt da Câmara, 1st Baron of Jardim do Mar, was its director and owner.

On October 5, 1911, when Funchal's telephone network was inaugurated, the first telephone communication was established between the headquarters of Diário de Notícias and the Central Station, where Manuel Augusto Martins was, at the time governor of the now-defunct District of Funchal.

Since 2005, when Lusomundo Serviços was acquired, it belongs to the Controlinveste group (now Global Media Group).

In 2010, in the 12th edition of the European Newspaper Award, the Diário de Notícias was awarded the title “European Journal of the Year”, in the category of local newspaper, an unprecedented distinction in the history of journalism in Madeira.

On 14 February 2014, the biggest shareholders, Sousa Group and Blandy Group, signed an agreement of intentions in which, once the deal is concluded, the majority of the capital belongs to the first with 77%, while the later holds 12%.

Regular columnists 
As a daily newspaper, Diário de Notícias has regular columnists that contribute to its opinion section, many of them with political and business links.

Political alignment and criticism 
Although the editorial statues declares the newspaper as "objective, independent and a source responsible information, based on the defence of the interests of Madeirans and Porto-Santenses, their Autonomy, as well as the National interest in which it is integrated", it has face great criticism from members of PPD-PSD Madeira, namely Alberto João Jardim. The former President of the Regional Government of Madeira has accused the owners of the newspaper, Blandy Group, of meddling, over a period of more than 40 years, in the regional political system and of promoting colonialism through their links with the Masonry and PS Madeira.

References 

Publications established in 1876
1876 establishments in Portugal
Portuguese-language newspapers